Cardwell v. American Bridge Co., 113 U.S. 205 (1885), was a bill in equity, for the removal of a bridge erected by the defendant over the American River in northern California, downriver from the property of the plaintiff on that navigable section of the river.

The doctrine that, in the absence of legislation by Congress, a state may authorize a navigable stream within its limits to be obstructed by a bridge or highway reasserted, and the former cases to that effect referred to.  The provision in the act admitting California

That all the navigable waters within the said state shall be common highways and forever free, as well to the inhabitants of said state as to the citizens of the United States, without any tax, impost, or duty therefor

does not deprive the state of the power possessed by other states, in the absence of legislation by Congress, to authorize the erection of bridges over navigable waters within the state. That provision aims to prevent the use of the navigable streams by private parties to the exclusion of the public and the exaction of tolls for their navigation.

The American River is a tributary of the Sacramento River in California. From its confluence with the Sacramento River, vessels starting upon it can proceed to  San Francisco Bay and the Pacific Ocean, and thence to adjoining states and foreign countries. It is therefore a navigable water of the United States and, as such, is under the control of the general government in the exercise of its power to regulate foreign and interstate commerce so far as may be necessary to insure its free navigation.

Steamboats and other craft were therefore obstructed by it in the navigation of the river.

The complainant alleged that he was the owner of a large tract of land, bordering on the river below Folsom, and raises many tons of grain each year; that he was also the owner of a steamboat and other vessels by which he could ship his grain down the river but for the obstruction caused by the bridge; that there are also large quarries of granite on his land sufficient to supply the markets of Sacramento and San Francisco for years, and also large deposits of cobblestone which have a value for paving, and, but for the obstruction, he could ship the granite and cobblestone by his vessels and sell them at a profit, whereas the expense of sending them by rail or other means open to him are such as to deprive him of all profit on them. He therefore files his bill against the company and prays that it may be enjoined from maintaining the bridge across the river until a draw shall have been placed in it sufficient to allow steamboats, vessels, and watercraft capable of navigating the stream to pass and repass freely and safely.

A demurrer to the bill was sustained and the bill dismissed, and the case is brought here on appeal.

The decree was affirmed.

See also
List of United States Supreme Court cases, volume 113

References

External links
 

United States Supreme Court cases
United States Supreme Court cases of the Waite Court
1885 in California
1885 in the environment
1885 in United States case law
American River (California)
Bridges in Sacramento County, California